Tommy Engel (born 1949) is a German musician and actor. He was the lead singer of German band Bläck Fööss through 1994, and has released albums as a solo performer.

Works (selection)
 (in cooperation with Klaus Heuser)

References

German male singers
German male television actors
Living people
1949 births
Place of birth missing (living people)